Kári Steinn Karlsson (born 19 May 1986) is an Icelandic long-distance runner. At the 2012 Summer Olympics, he competed in the men's marathon, finishing in 42nd place.

Kári went to University of California, Berkeley.

References

External links
 
 IAAF profile for Kári Steinn Karlsson

1986 births
Kari Steinn Karlsson
Kari Steinn Karlsson
Athletes (track and field) at the 2012 Summer Olympics
Living people
Kari Steinn Karlsson
Olympic male marathon runners